Corey Davis (born July 14, 1985) is a former American football offensive lineman. He was originally signed by the Buffalo Bills as an undrafted free agent in 2007. He played college football at James Madison.

References

External links
 Georgia Force bio
 AFL stats

1985 births
Living people
People from Lynwood, California
American football offensive linemen
Buffalo Bills players
Georgia Force players
James Madison Dukes football players
Milwaukee Iron players
Players of American football from California
Players of American football from Virginia
Sportspeople from Hampton, Virginia
Sportspeople from Los Angeles County, California